Jamaican may refer to:

 Something or someone of, from, or related to the country of Jamaica
 Jamaicans, people from Jamaica
 Jamaican English, a variety of English spoken in Jamaica
 Jamaican Patois, an English-based creole language
 Culture of Jamaica
 Jamaican cuisine

See also 

Demographics of Jamaica
List of Jamaicans
Languages of Jamaica

Language and nationality disambiguation pages